Presidential elections were held in Nauru on 11 June 2013.

Results

References

2013
2013 in Nauru
2013 elections in Oceania
2013